William Avenya (born 21 June 1955) is a Nigerian prelate of the Catholic Church, who is the bishop of the diocese of Gboko, Nigeria. Avenya is the first bishop of the diocese since its creation on 29 December 2012. He served as secretary general of the Association of Episcopal Conferences of Anglophone West Africa (AECAWA).

Early life and education 
William Amove Avenya was born on 21 June 1955 in Ishangev Tiev, Konshisha Local Government Area, Benue State, Nigeria. He attended Mount Saint Gabriel's Secondary School in Makurdi and completed ecclesiastical studies at St Augustine's Major Seminary Jos (1975-1981). He studied at the University of Manchester (1989–1990), pursuing a master's degree in education and a PhD. In 2000, he earned a diploma in management and development of non-governmental organizations at Galilee International Management Institute, Israel.

Religious life 
Avenya was ordained a priest on 30 May 1981. He was appointed auxiliary bishop of Makurdi, Nigeria, on 28 November 2008. He was appointed titular bishop of Thucca in Mauretania on 28 November 2008 and ordained a bishop on 24 January 2009 in Makurdi, Benue. He was appointed bishop of the diocese of Gboko on 29 December 2012 by Pope Benedict XVI and installed on 24 February 2013.

On 17 February 2020, after the death of Peter Iorzuul Adoboh, the bishop of the diocese of Katsina-Ala, Avenya was appointed apostolic administrator of Katsina-Ala. He served in that role until Pope Francis appointed a new bishop in July 2020.

References

External links

21st-century Roman Catholic bishops in Nigeria
People from Benue State
1955 births
Living people
Roman Catholic bishops of Gboko